Eleanor 'Ellie' Cardwell  is an English international netball player. She plays in goal attack and goal shooter for England, and at the club level represents Manchester Thunder in the Netball Superleague.

Cardwell was born in Blackpool, joining Blackpool Netball Club at the age of 10.
She played with Manchester Thunder initially as a defender, before transitioning to attack in the 2015 and 2016 Superleague seasons.
In 2016 she represented England in Netball Europe.  Following her time with Manchester Thunder, she played at Severn Stars for two seasons, before returning to Manchester ahead of the 2019 Superleague season. Eleanor will join Adelaide Thunderbirds for the 2023 Suncorp Super Netball season.

References

Living people
1994 births
Sportspeople from Blackpool
English netball players
Netball Superleague players
Manchester Thunder players
Severn Stars players
Netball players at the 2022 Commonwealth Games
Adelaide Thunderbirds players
English expatriate netball people in Australia